Dr. Khalil Ibrahim (1957 – 23 December 2011) was a Sudanese insurgent leader who was the founder of the Justice and Equality Movement (JEM).

Personal life
Ibrahim was born in Sudan in 1957. Ibrahim was from the Koba branch of the Zaghawa ethnic group, which is located mainly in Sudan, with a minority on the Chad side of the border. He was an enthusiastic supporter of the National Islamic Front (NIF) seizure of power under the direction of Islamist Hassan al-Turabi in 1989. He also served as the state minister for education in Darfur between 1991 and 1994 in al-Fashir, North Darfur. A physician, Dr. Khalil spent four months in 1992 to fight Sudan People's Armed Forces. By Ibrahim's own account, he was disaffected with the Islamist movement by 2000 after seeing the economic neglect of the NIF, as well as its support to armed militias. At this time, he became part of a covert cell of Islamists who were seeking to change the NiF from inside. Dr. Ibrahim went on to serve as the state minister for social affairs in Blue Nile in 1997 before a post as adviser to the governor of Southern Sudan in Juba in 1998. However, others noted that he never received a national level appointment. Ibrahim's colleague in JEM, Ahmad Tugod, stated, "Khalil is not a first or even second class political leader. [...] He struggled all of his life to get a post in Khartoum." He quit the post in August 1998, several months before the end of his appointment, and formed an NGO called "Fighting Poverty". In December 1999, when al-Bashir sidelined al-Turabi with the help of Ali Osman Taha, Dr. Ibrahim was in the Netherlands, studying for a Masters in Public Health at Universiteit Maastricht.

In the meantime, the structure of covert cells that Ibrahim had helped set up in 1994 had spread to Khartoum. The dissidents, dubbing themselves "The Seekers of Truth and Justice" published the Black Book in 2000, claiming that riverine Arabs dominated political power and resources. In 2001, Khalil Ibrahim was one of twenty people sent out of the country by the dissidents to go public. In August 2001, Ibrahim published a press release from the Netherlands, in which he announced the formation of the Justice and Equality Movement. The JEM has a relatively small ethnic base of support, being limited to the Kobe Zaghawa, including many kinsmen from across the Chadian border. Ibrahim received political and financial support from Libya and its leader Muammar Gaddafi. After the NTC's win in the 2011 Libyan civil war against the government of the Jamahiriya he was forced to flee back to Darfur.

Darfur conflict
On 5 March 2002, Dr. Ibrahim claimed credit for initiating a government revolt. This apparent claim of the landmark attack on Golo, actually carried out by the Sudan Liberation Army, was mocked by the SLA and the JEM was forced to back away from their announcement. Regardless, the JEM and the anti-government SLA formed a loose alliance in prosecuting the Darfur conflict.

In May 2006, the JEM rejected the Abuja peace process, which was accepted by the faction of the SLA led by Minni Minnawi, but rejected by the smaller SLA factions. On 30 June 2006, Ibrahim, Khamis Abdalla, the leader of an SLM faction, Dr Sharif Harir and Ahmed Ibrahim, co-leaders of the National Democratic Alliance (Sudan), founded the National Redemption Front rebel group in Asmara, Eritrea but which is based in Chad.

Ibrahim lived in exile in Libya from May 2010 to September 2011, when the Libyan civil war compelled him to flee across the Sahara and return to Darfur. The Sudanese government and diplomatic sources accused Ibrahim's group of rebels in Libya of fighting as mercenaries for Libyan strongman Muammar Gaddafi during the war, charges to which Ibrahim never responded, neither being proved.

Death
The Sudan Armed Forces announced that it had killed Ibrahim with an air strike in North Kordofan on 23 December 2011.

References 

1957 births
2011 deaths
Zaghawa people
People from North Darfur
People of the War in Darfur
Sudanese Islamists
Deaths by airstrike
Sudanese physicians